The 1930 Vanderbilt Commodores football team was an American football team that represented Vanderbilt University as a member of the Southern Conference during the 1930 college football season. In their 26th season under head coach Dan McGugin, Vanderbilt compiled an 8–2 record.

Schedule

References

Vanderbilt
Vanderbilt Commodores football seasons
Vanderbilt Commodores football